The 2018 Junior World Fencing Championships took place in Verona, Italy from 1 to 9 April.

Medal summary

Junior events

Men's events

Women's events

Cadet events

Men's events

Women's events

Medal table

References
 Full Results

Junior World Fencing Championships
2018 in fencing
International fencing competitions hosted by Italy
2018 in Italian sport
Fencing
Sport in Verona
Fencing